Butin or Botin located on the Pendro terrain in Kurdistan Region. Hunting in Butin is prohibited and it is home to a large population of Wild Goat and other wildlife. Butin has a lot of valuable trees and mountain herbs, the most extensive growths on the Butin slopes.

Photo gallery

References

External links 
Qimmat Kurri Butinah

Zagros Mountains
Mountains of Kurdistan
Mountains of Iraq